Dodanga lobipennis is a moth in the family Crambidae. It was described by Frederic Moore in 1884–87. It is found in Sri Lanka.

References

Acentropinae
Moths of Sri Lanka
Taxa named by Frederic Moore
Moths described in 1886